Spencer Machacek (born October 14, 1988) is a Canadian professional ice hockey player who is currently under contract to Grizzlys Wolfsburg of the Deutsche Eishockey Liga (DEL).

Playing career

Junior
Machacek began his major junior career in 2005–06 with the Vancouver Giants of the Western Hockey League (WHL). He recorded 45 points in each of his first two seasons, playing an integral part in the Giants' 2006 President's Cup and 2007 Memorial Cup championships.

Ranked 54th among North American skaters by the Central Scouting Service at the mid-season mark of his draft year, Machacek was selected by the Atlanta Thrashers in the 3rd round, 67th overall, in the 2007 NHL Entry Draft. Machacek returned to the WHL and was named team captain of the Giants (replacing the departed Brett Festerling) at the start of the 2007–08 season. Former teammate Milan Lucic had originally been chosen as Fersterling's successor, but made the Boston Bruins roster out of training camp. As team captain, he recorded career highs with 33 goals and 78 points in 70 games and was named Player of the Month for February after going on a 27-point tear in 14 games.

Professional
At the end of the first round of the 2008 WHL playoffs, he signed his first NHL contract with the Thrashers on March 28, 2008. Reporting to the Thrashers' training camp for the 2008–09 season, he was assigned to the Chicago Wolves of the American Hockey League (AHL) on September 27. Late in the season, he was called up by the Thrashers and made his NHL debut on March 16, 2009, in a 5–1 win against the Washington Capitals recording 7 minutes and 21 seconds of playing time. Machacek played two games total for the Thrashers in his professional rookie season while recording 48 points in 77 games in the AHL.

During the inaugural 2011–12 season for the Winnipeg Jets, Machacek scored his first NHL goal on March 23, 2012 against Washington's Michal Neuvirth. He finished the season with the Jets posting a promising 9 points in 13 games.

In the lockout shortened 2012–13 season, whilst with affiliate the St. John's IceCaps, he was traded by the Jets to the Columbus Blue Jackets in exchange for Tomas Kubalik on March 10, 2013.

In his first full season with Blue Jackets affiliate, the Springfield Falcons in the 2013–14 season, Machacek was again traded on February 6, 2014, to the Pittsburgh Penguins in exchange for Paul Thompson.

On October 8, 2014, after an unsuccessful try-out with the Toronto Maple Leafs, Machacek opted to sign his first contract abroad with German club, Augsburger Panther of the DEL.

After one season with Augsburg, Machacek opted to remain in the DEL for the 2015–16 season in signing with Eisbären Berlin on May 7. 2015. After two seasons in Berlin, Machacek left as a free agent to sign a one-year deal with his third DEL club, Düsseldorfer EG, on May 7, 2017. In the 2017–18 season, Machacek set new career DEL high of 13 goals for 28 points in 52 games with DEG.

On April 9, 2018, Machacek joined his fourth DEL club in five seasons by agreeing to terms on a one-year deal with Grizzlys Wolfsburg.

Career statistics

Awards and honours

References

External links

1988 births
Living people
Atlanta Thrashers draft picks
Atlanta Thrashers players
Augsburger Panther players
Brooks Bandits players
Canadian ice hockey right wingers
Chicago Wolves players
Düsseldorfer EG players
Eisbären Berlin players
Ice hockey people from Alberta
Sportspeople from Lethbridge
St. John's IceCaps players
Springfield Falcons players
Vancouver Giants players
Wilkes-Barre/Scranton Penguins players
Winnipeg Jets players
Grizzlys Wolfsburg players